José Acasuso was the defending champion but decided not to participate.
Antonio Veić won the title when his opponent Paul Capdeville retired during the final match. Veić was leading 3–6, 6–4, 5–2.

Seeds

Draw

Finals

Top half

Bottom half

References
 Main Draw
 Qualifying Draw

Aberto Santa Catarina de Tenis - Singles
2012 Singles